Camel Heda’a (Arabic: حداء الإبل, Heda’a Al Ebel) is an oral tradition of calling a flock of camels passed on through generations. It is one of the oral expressions in the Kingdom of Saudi Arabia, Oman and United Arab Emirates.

Description 
Camel Heda'a It can be defined as a set of sounds made by camel herders to communicate with their flocks and deliver a specific message on different occasions. The camels interact with those sounds depending on the tone and how they are trained by herders.

Location 
Every place where camels are kept e.g. Arabian Peninsula.

Inscription on UNESCO 
On November 30, 2022, the Kingdom of Saudi Arabia, in cooperation with Sultanate of Oman and United Arab Emirates, succeeded in inscribing "AlHeda'a" element on the Representative List of the Intangible Cultural Heritage of the United Nations Educational, Scientific and Cultural Organization (UNESCO).

References

External links 
Files 2022 under process - intangible heritage - Culture Sector - UNESCO

 
Saudi Arabian culture
Saudi
Arab culture
Camelids
Emirati culture
Livestock
Arabian Peninsula
Animal husbandry occupations